Sliding may refer to:

Sliding (dance), also floating or gliding, a group of footwork-oriented dance techniques
Slide (baseball), an attempt by a baseball runner to avoid getting tagged out
Sliding (motion)

See also
Slide (disambiguation)
Slider (disambiguation)